Ballygittle is a townland in County Tyrone, Northern Ireland. It is situated in the historic barony of Dungannon Middle and the civil parish of Clonoe and covers an area of 169 acres. It is close to Stewartstown.

The name derives from the Irish: Baile a n-Giatail (town of the grain).

The population of the townland declined during the 19th century:

See also
List of townlands of County Tyrone

References

Townlands of County Tyrone
Civil parish of Clonoe